was a Japanese daimyō of the late Edo period. Famed for his tenure as rōjū, Itakura later became a Shinto priest.

Biography

Itakura, born to the Hisamatsu-Matsudaira of the Kuwana Domain, was adopted by Itakura Katsutsune, the lord of the Matsuyama domain. As a student of Yamada Hōkoku, Itakura worked to reform his domain's administration and finances. His childhood name was Matsudaira Yatsuhachiro (松平寧八郎) later Mannoshin (万之進).

Itakura entered the ranks of the shogunate bureaucracy.  He served as jisha-bugyō in 1857–1859 and again in 1861–1862.  He became a rōjū in 1862.

Itakura fought in the Boshin War, and served as a staff officer of the Ōuetsu Reppan Dōmei. He joined the Ezo Republic, and fought at Hakodate. After a short time in prison, he was released in the early 1870s, and later became priest of the Tōshōgu Shrine in Ueno.

Family
 Father: Matsudaira Sadanaga (1791-1838)
 Mother: Zuishin-in
 Wife: Itakura Katsutsune‘s daughter
 Concubine: Otsuru no kata
 Son: Itakura Katsutake

Notes

References
 Beasley, William G. (1955).  Select Documents on Japanese Foreign Policy, 1853–1868. London: Oxford University Press. [reprinted by RoutledgeCurzon, London, 2001.   (cloth)]

References
 Japanese Wikipedia article on Itakura Katsukiyo (22 Sept. 2007)

Further reading
Asamori Kaname 朝森要 (1975). Bakumatsu no Kakurō Itakura Katsukiyo 幕末の閣老板倉勝靜. Okayama: Fukutake Shoten 福武書店.
Tamura Eitarō 田村栄太郎 (1941). Itakura Iga no Kami 板倉伊賀守. Tokyo: Sangensha 三元社.
Tokunaga Shin'ichirō 德永真一郎 (1982). Bakumatsu kakuryōden 幕末閣僚伝. Tokyo: Mainichi Shinbunsha 每日新聞社.
Totman, Conrad (1980). The Collapse of the Tokugawa Bakufu. Honolulu: University of Hawai'i Press.

1823 births
1889 deaths
Meiji Restoration
Kannushi
People of the Boshin War
Hisamatsu-Matsudaira clan
Itakura clan
Rōjū
Fudai daimyo